Thomas Charles Lynch (born April 7, 1942) is a retired rear admiral in the United States Navy. He was Superintendent of the United States Naval Academy in Annapolis, Maryland from June 15, 1991 to August 1, 1994.

Early life
Born in Lima, Ohio, the son of Rodney and Marie Lynch, he is a 1964 graduate of the United States Naval Academy. He played football there, lettering three times and captaining the 1963 team. He also was involved in boxing.

Career
Lynch also held the command of the Eisenhower Battle Group during the course of Operation Desert Shield, and chief of Navy Legislative Affairs. He retired in 1995, in the position of Director of the Navy Staff at the Pentagon in Washington, D.C. He is currently affiliated with Newday Veteran Mortgage Services (Newday USA).

Board memberships
In 2012, Lynch was named to the board of directors of Premier Holdings Corporation, an energy services holding company.  As the chairman of the board at mortgage bank NewDay USA, he also appears as its spokesman for VA home loans on television.

Personal life
Lynch was married to Kathleen Quinn and has three children. His wife died on May 18, 2010.

His younger brother, Jim, played in the National Football League.

References

1942 births
Living people
Navy Midshipmen football players
Superintendents of the United States Naval Academy
United States Navy admirals
People from Lima, Ohio